Birkebeinerrennet (lit. The Birkebeiner race) is a long-distance cross-country ski marathon held annually in Norway. It debuted in 1932 and has been a part of Worldloppet since Worldloppet's inception in 1979.

The Birkebeinerrennet is one of three races held under the Birkebeiner moniker, the other two being Birkebeinerrittet (bicycling) and Birkebeinerløpet (cross-country running).

The race was inspired by a notable journey made by the Birkebeiner loyalists Torstein Skevla and Skjervald Skrukka to save the infant heir to the Norwegian throne, Håkon Håkonsson, in the winter of 1206.

Researchers at the Manchester Metropolitan University found that the metabolic cost for modern ski models is about 2.5 J/kg*m as compared to about 5 J/kg*m for ski models dated 542 AD. They also estimated maximum cross country speed for the 542 AD ski to 5 m/s, compared to about 12 m/s for modern cross country skis; for long distance skiing (several hours) results were 3 and 7 m/s respectively. This corresponds to about 5 hours for the original 1206 AD Birkebeiner flight.

Race
The number of participants has been steadily increasing each year, and for the 2011 race, the limit was set at 16,000.

The following aid stations are present:
Skramstadsetra, 9 km
Dambua, 15 km
Kvarstad, 28 km
Midtfjellet, 35 km
Sjusjøen, 40 km

History

Origin

The Birkebeinerrennet has been held since 1932, and commemorates a trip made by the Birkebeiner loyalists Torstein Skevla and Skjervald Skrukka to save the infant heir to the Norwegian throne, Håkon Håkonsson, in 1206. All participants carry a backpack weighing at least 3.5 kg, symbolizing the weight of the then one-year-old king. The inaugural edition was won by Trygve Beisvåg. An own class for women was established in 1976.
Until 1991, the start city was alternated between Lillehamer (finish at Rena) and Rena (finish at Lillehamer). The last time that Birkebeinerrenet started at Lillehammer, the start was located on the site where the Lysgårdsbakken ski jumping arena were built for the 1994 Winter Olympics.

Special 2002 FIS World Cup Race
In 2002, the race was included as the last event in the FIS World Cup. The World Cup class was won by Thomas Alsgaard and Anita Moen Guidon finishing in
2:24:08.7 and
2:43:39.1,
respectively, faster than all records set prior to 2012 for men and prior to 2015 for women. However, the participants in the World Cup class were not required to carry the 3.5 kg backpack, and these times set in 2002 were therefore not considered as records.

Recent years
In 2007, the race was cancelled for the first time in history due to extremely high winds (90 km/h or 55 mph). However, at the time of cancellation, the event had been under way for nearly an hour, with roughly a quarter of the 13,000 competitors already on course. Despite the efforts of officials to send everyone back to the starting point, 55 competitors eventually reached the finish in Lillehammer, and upon being interviewed, blasted the decision to cancel the event .

The race was also cancelled in 2014, only 15 minutes before the start due to high winds of 15 m/s. Despite the cancellation, thousands of skiers completed the route from Rena to Lillehammer (and from Lillehammer to Rena) and criticized the decision. The organizers also decided not to give any refunds, which caused an investigation by the Norwegian Skiing Federation. In 2015, conditions were good for skiing fast and new records were set in both the men's and the women's classes. Petter Eliassen skied in 2 hours, 19 minutes and 28 seconds, more than two minutes faster than the previous record set by Anders Aukland in 2012. Therese Johaug skied the 2015 edition in 2 hours, 41 minutes and 46 seconds and set a new record for female skiers. The 2020 edition was cancelled due to the coronavirus pandemic.

Past winners
Course record in bold.

Men

Women

Birken Ski Festival 
In the week preceding Birkebeinerrennet, several cross-country skiing races are held during the Birken Ski Festival:
 Inga-låmi (ladies – )
 HalvBirken (half – )
 BarneBirken (kids)
 UngdomsBirken (9–16 years old – )
 StafettBirken (relay – )
 FredagsBirken (Friday, original race – )
 Birkebeinerrennet (original – )

References

External links

KMZ file tracing out the route of the race Requires Google Earth software.
2D View in Google Maps.
Official homepage (in Norwegian)
English version of the official homepage
German version of the official homepage

Cross-country skiing competitions in Norway
Åmot
Sport in Hedmark
Sport in Lillehammer
1932 establishments in Norway
Recurring sporting events established in 1932
March sporting events